Slacker is a 1990 American independent comedy-drama film written, produced, and directed by Richard Linklater, who also appears in the film. Slacker was nominated for the Grand Jury Prize - Dramatic at the Sundance Film Festival in 1991.

In 2012, the film was selected for preservation in the United States National Film Registry by the Library of Congress as being "culturally, historically, or aesthetically significant".

Plot
Slacker follows a single day in the life of an ensemble of mostly under-30 bohemians and misfits in Austin, Texas. The film follows various eccentric and misfit characters and scenes, never staying with one character or conversation for more than a few minutes before picking up someone else in the scene and following them.

The characters include Linklater as a talkative taxi passenger, a UFO buff who insists the U.S. has been on the moon since the 1950s, a JFK conspiracy theorist, an elderly anarchist who befriends a man trying to rob his house, a television set collector, and a hipster woman trying to sell a Madonna pap smear. The woman selling the pap smear appears on the film poster, and was played by Butthole Surfers drummer Teresa Taylor.

Most of the characters grapple with feelings of social exclusion or political marginalization, which are recurring themes in their conversations. They discuss social class, terrorism, joblessness, and government control of the media.

Cast

Production
Slackers working title was No Longer/Not Yet. The film was shot in 1989 with a 16 mm Arriflex camera on location in Austin, Texas with a budget of $23,000 ($ in today's dollars), and premiered at Austin's Dobie Theater on July 27, 1990. Orion Classics acquired Slacker for nationwide distribution, and released a slightly modified 35mm version on July 5, 1991. It did not receive a wide release but went on to become a cult film bringing in a domestic gross of $1.2 million ($ in today's dollars). The cast includes many notable Austinites, including Louis Black, Abra Moore, and members of some local bands of the era.

Release

Critical reception
Roger Ebert gave the film three out of four stars and wrote, "Slacker is a movie with an appeal almost impossible to describe, although the method of the director, Richard Linklater, is as clear as day. He wants to show us a certain strata of campus life at the present time". In his review for The New York Times, Vincent Canby wrote, "Slacker is a 14-course meal composed entirely of desserts or, more accurately, a conventional film whose narrative has been thrown out and replaced by enough bits of local color to stock five years' worth of ordinary movies".

Owen Gleiberman of Entertainment Weekly gave the film an "A−" rating, writing, "Slacker has a marvelously low-key observational cool ... the movie never loses its affectionate, shaggy-dog sense of America as a place in which people, by now, have almost too much freedom on their hands". In his review for the Washington Post, Hal Hinson wrote, "This is a work of scatterbrained originality, funny, unexpected and ceaselessly engaging". Rolling Stones Peter Travers wrote, "What Linklater has captured is a generation of bristling minds unable to turn their thoughts into action. Linklater has the gift of a true satirist: He can make laughter catch in the throat".

In his review for the Austin Chronicle, Chris Walters wrote, "Few of the many films shot in Austin over the past 10 or 15 years even attempt to make something of the way its citizens live. Slacker is the only one I know of that claims this city's version of life on the margins of the working world as its whole subject, and it is one of the first American movies ever to find a form so apropos to the themes of disconnectedness and cultural drift". Time magazine's Richard Corliss wrote, "Though set in the '90s, Slacker has a spirit that is pure '60s, and in this loping, loopy, sidewise, delightful comedy, Austin is Haight-Ashbury".

On review aggregator website Rotten Tomatoes, the film holds an approval rating of 81% based on 43 reviews, and an average rating of 7.3/10. The website's critical consensus reads, "Slacker rests its shiftless thumb on the pulse of a generation with fresh filmmaking that captures the tenor of its time while establishing a benchmark for 1990s indie cinema." On Metacritic, the film has a weighted average score of 69 out of 100, based on 16 critics, indicating "generally favorable reviews".

American Film Institute recognition:
 AFI's 100 Years... 100 Laughs - Nominated

Home media
Slacker was released on VHS in June 1992 by Orion Home Video. An estimated 7,000 copies were shipped (it was also released on LaserDisc, but a reliable estimate of units shipped is lacking). A book also titled Slacker containing the screenplay, interviews, and writing about the film was published by St. Martin's Press, also in 1992. The film was re-released on VHS on March 7, 2000, by MGM. The film was released to DVD worldwide on January 13, 2003. A two-disc Criterion Collection boxed-set edition was released on August 31, 2004, in the US and Canada only. The set has many "extras", including a book on the film and Linklater's first feature film, It's Impossible to Learn to Plow by Reading Books, released on home video for the first time. Entertainment Weekly gave this edition an "A−" rating.

Impact and legacy
The release of the film is often taken as a starting point (along with the earlier Sex, Lies, and Videotape) for the independent film movement of the 1990s. Many of the independent filmmakers of that period credit the film with inspiring or opening doors for them, including Kevin Smith, who has said that the film was the inspiration for Clerks. The film also popularized the use of slacker to describe "a person regarded as one of a large group or generation of young people (especially in the early to mid 1990s) characterized by apathy, aimlessness, and lack of ambition".

Linklater has said that he wanted the word to have positive connotations. For example, in a self-interview in the Austin Chronicle, Linklater stated: “Slackers might look like the left-behinds of society, but they are actually one step ahead, rejecting most of society and the social hierarchy before it rejects them. The dictionary defines slackers as people who evade duties and responsibilities. A more modern notion would be people who are ultimately being responsible to themselves and not wasting their time in a realm of activity that has nothing to do with who they are or what they might be ultimately striving for.”

In the early 1990s, Slacker was widely considered an accurate depiction of Generation X because the film's young adult characters are more interested in quasi-intellectual pastimes and socializing than career advancement. Linklater—who is a member of the "Baby Boom" generation—has long since eschewed the role of generational spokesperson. Moreover, Slacker includes members of various generations, and many of its themes are universal rather than generation-specific.

Slacker 2011
In 2011, to commemorate the 20th anniversary of Slacker'''s release, Daniel Metz and Lars Nilsen of the Alamo Drafthouse Cinema chain developed a remake of the film, titled Slacker 2011, which is an anthology film in which each segment of the original film is remade as a segment written and directed by a different filmmaker or filmmaking team. Altogether 26 directors were involved in the film, including Bradley Beesley, Bob Byington, Michael Dolan, Jay Duplass, Geoff Marslett, PJ Raval, Bob Ray, Duane Graves, Ben Steinbauer and David Zellner. Some segments are word-for-word remakes, while others are only loosely based on their source material. The film was produced by Alamo Drafthouse and the Austin Film Society. Linklater was not involved in the project, although he approved of the idea, saying, "It would be against the slacker ethic to not give one’s blessing to someone else's weird inspiration."

See also
 1991 in film
 Low-budget film
 Hyperlink cinema

References

External links

 

 
 
 
 
 Slacker: Slacking Off, an essay by John Pierson at the Criterion Collection
 Slack to the Future, a 20th anniversary conversation between the Austin Chronicle'''s Marc Savlov, Richard Linklater and John Pierson

1990 comedy-drama films
American comedy-drama films
1990s English-language films
Films directed by Richard Linklater
Films about anarchism
Films about social issues
Films set in Austin, Texas
Films shot in Austin, Texas
Camcorder films
American independent films
1990 independent films
American nonlinear narrative films
United States National Film Registry films
1990 films
Films shot in 16 mm film
1990s American films
English-language comedy-drama films